Henryk Baran (29 July 1934 – 28 June 1977) was a Polish footballer who played as a forward who spent a season playing in Poland's highest division.

Biography

Born in the Ząbkowice district of Dąbrowa Górnicza, Baran started playing football with his local team Unia Ząbkowice. He played with Unia until 1952, when he joined I liga side Lechia Gdańsk. His Lechia debut came on 9 November 1952 playing in the Polish Cup against Śląsk Wrocław. The following season Baran made his league debut for Lechia, with his I liga debut being made against Lech Poznań. Over the course of the 1953 season Baran made 16 appearances and scored 4 goals for Lechia in Poland's top division. Baran was associated with Lechia until 1956, but didn't make another first team appearance after the 1953 season. In 1957 he returned back to Unia Ząbkowice being a player-manager until 1964. In 1977 Baran died from a heart attack aged only 42. He was buried in Dąbrowa Górnicza.

References

1934 births
1977 deaths
Polish footballers
Lechia Gdańsk players
Polish football managers
Association football forwards
20th-century Polish people